was a term given to four samurai during the  Bakumatsu era in Japanese history. The four men were Kawakami Gensai, Kirino Toshiaki (also known as Nakamura Hanjirō), Tanaka Shinbei, and Okada Izō. They opposed the Tokugawa shogunate (and later, supported the Meiji Emperor). These four samurai were considered elite warriors. The word hitokiri literally means "manslayer" or "man cutter," as the kanji 人 means person, while 斬 can alternatively mean slay or cut.

In fiction
 Hitokiri is a 1969 film directed by Hideo Gosha and starring Shintaro Katsu as Okada Izo and Yukio Mishima as Tanaka Shinbei.
 The manga and anime series Rurouni Kenshin is about a former hitokiri named Himura Kenshin, who is based loosely on Kawakami Gensai. Kenshin is also known as Hitokiri Battousai (人斬り抜刀斎), or "Sword-drawing Manslayer".
 Hideaki Sorachi's manga Gin Tama involves fictionalized versions of two of the four hitokiri (particularly Okada and Kawakami), set in an alternate version of Bakumatsu-era Japan.
 The Hitokiri is a playable character in the video game For Honor, serving as a heavy hero of the Samurai faction and fighting with a two-handed axe.
 The 2014 video game Ryū ga Gotoku Ishin! features Okada Izo as one of the main antagonists. The 2023 remake version, Like a Dragon: Ishin!, also features Kawakami Gensai, Tanaka Shinbei and Nakamura Hanjiro as minor antagonists appearing in side missions.

References 

Japanese historical terms
Samurai
Quartets